Willie Alphonso Bobo (1902 – February 22, 1931) was an American Negro league first baseman between 1923 and 1930.

A native of Tennessee, Bobo made his Negro leagues debut in 1923 with the Kansas City Monarchs. He played the next five seasons with the St. Louis Stars, and finished his career with a two-year stint with the Nashville Elite Giants in 1929 and 1930. Bobo died in San Diego, California in 1931 at age 28 or 29.

References

External links
 and Baseball-Reference Black Baseball stats and Seamheads

1902 births
1931 deaths
Place of birth missing
Date of birth missing
Cleveland Tigers (baseball) players
Kansas City Monarchs players
Nashville Elite Giants players
St. Louis Stars (baseball) players
20th-century African-American sportspeople
Baseball infielders